Philasterida (the philasterid ciliates) is an order of ciliates in the subclass Scuticociliatia.

References

External links 
 

 
Ciliate orders